Hackelia mundula is a species of flowering plant in the borage family known by the common name pink stickseed. It is native to the high mountains of California, especially the Sierra Nevada. Its range extends into Oregon. This is a lush, hairy perennial herb growing to maximum heights between 40 and 80 centimeters. It produces an array of erect stems with oval- or lance-shaped leaves most abundant around the bases, growing up to 22 centimeters long.  The upper stems are mostly leafless and hold cyme inflorescences of flowers. Each petite flower has 5 rounded lobes which are light pink and age to light blue in color, each with a smaller petallike appendage at its base. The fruit is a small nutlet covered in thin, hairlike prickles.

External links
Jepson Manual Treatment
Photo gallery

mundula
Flora of California
Flora without expected TNC conservation status